Spytihněv II (also Spitignew, Spitihnew or Spytihnev; ; 1031 – 28 January 1061), a member of the Přemyslid dynasty, was Duke of Bohemia from 1055 until his death.

Life
He was the eldest son of Duke Bretislav I (d. 1055) and his consort Judith of Schweinfurt. While his father entered into conflict with the Salian king Henry III, young Spytihněv from 1039 onwards spent several years as a hostage at the German court.

When he succeeded his father as duke, his coronation was celebrated with the first known rendition of Hospodine pomiluj ny, the earliest known song in Czech. After his accession to the throne, he went at once to Regensburg to receive imperial confirmation. According to the contemporary chronicler Cosmas of Prague, this loyalty to the Holy Roman Empire did not prevent him from expelling all Germans from his lands, including his mother Judith, and the new anti-German policy continued to his death.

In 1056, Spytihněv had all the monks driven out of Sazava Abbey, yet despite this, Pope Nicholas II sought the alliance of the Bohemian duke in 1059. Thus, Rome granted Spytihněv the right to wear the mitre and tunic of a bishop for the annual sum of 100 marks.

His brothers having inherited Moravia, Spytihněv tried to reduce their authority by arresting 300 Moravian magnates and stripping his brothers of their rights in the province. Thus, Vratislaus of Olomouc fled to Hungary in 1058.

Spytihněv was succeeded by Vratislaus, who in turn entrusted Moravia to his brother Conrad.

Marriage
About 1054 Spytihněv was married to Ida of Wettin (Hidda), a daughter of Margrave Theodoric II of Lusatia. They had:

Svatobor (Friedrich), Patriarch of Aquileia in 1084. Shortly afterwards, on 23 Feb 1086, he was murdered.

Notes

References

Roman Catholic monarchs
Dukes of Bohemia
1031 births
1061 deaths
Burials at St. Vitus Cathedral